Yishun Park is a 14-hectare park located in Yishun, Singapore. It is within the vicinity of Northland Primary School, SAFRA Yishun Country Club and Yishun Park Hawker Centre. The park is connected to Yishun Pond Park by an 84-meter elevated bridge.

History
Plans for the development of Yishun Park were first announced in November 1993, and the park was opened to the public in January 1995.

In October 1997, the Minister of Defence released plans for the construction of a SAFRA clubhouse within the park. In 2008, the Dipterocarp Arbotereum, a  project comprising the planting of multiple dipterocarp trees and the installation of signs about the trees' heritage, was carried out in the park.

Description
Developed on an old rubber estate, Yishun Park has a variety of rare Indo-Malayan trees (e.g. Shorea, Kapur, Chengal), tropical fruit trees (e.g. rambutan, durian, guava, starfruit) and numerous bird species. There are also many rubber trees and fallen rubber seeds in the park.

The park also features an allotment gardening scheme hosted by the National Parks Board.

See also
List of parks in Singapore

References

External links
Yishun Park at National Parks Board, Singapore

Yishun
Parks in Singapore